The Department of Agriculture, Fisheries and Forestry or DAFF is a former department of the Isle of Man Government.

In April 2010, the Department was broken up and most functions absorbed by Department of Environment, Food and Agriculture

Previous Ministers

Previous Ministers for Environment, Food and Agriculture
Geoffrey Boot MHK, 2016–present
Richard Ronan MHK, 2014–2016
Phil Gawne MHK, 2011–2014
John Shimmin MHK, 2010–2011

Previous Ministers for Agriculture, Fisheries and Forestry
Phil Gawne MHK, 2005–2010
Bill Henderson MHK, 2004–2005
John Rimmington MHK, 2002–2004
Alex Downie MLC, 1999–2002
Hazel Hannan MHK, 1995–1999
John Corrin MHK, 1991–1995
David North MHK, 1989–1991
Donald Gelling MLC, 1988–1989
Don Maddrell MHK, 1986–1988

Previous Chairmen of the Board of Agriculture and Fisheries
Norman Radcliffe MLC, 1985–1986
John Radcliffe. M.H.K.  1981–1985
Dr Colonel Edgar Mann, 1980–1981
Unknown, 1971–1980
Norman Crowe MHK, 1967–1971
Unknown, 1958–1967
Richard Cannell MHK, 1950–1958
John Cowin MLC, 1946–1950

External links
Website for DEFA, Isle of Man Government Department of Environment, Food and Agriculture

Government of the Isle of Man
Economy of the Isle of Man
Agriculture ministries
Isle of Man
Fisheries agencies
Forestry in the United Kingdom
Agriculture in the Isle of Man